Hector Arawwawala was the fifth Governor of North Western Province. He was part of the United National Party.

References

External links
Sri Lankan Provinces from 1988 

Living people
Year of birth missing (living people)
Governors of North Western Province, Sri Lanka